The following lists events that happened during 2015 in Uzbekistan.

Incumbents
President: Islam Karimov 
Prime Minister: Shavkat Mirziyoyev

Events

January
 January 4 - Parliamentary elections were held with a second round.

March
 March 29 - Voters go to the polls for a presidential election with incumbent President Islam Karimov winning the election with 90% of the vote.

References 

 
2010s in Uzbekistan
Uzbekistan
Uzbekistan
Years of the 21st century in Uzbekistan